"Anna Marie" is a song written by Cindy Walker, sung by Jim Reeves, and released on the RCA Victor label. In December 1958, it peaked at No. 3 on Billboards country and western jockey chart. It spent 18 weeks on the charts and was also ranked No. 35 on Billboards 1958 year-end country and western chart.

See also
 Billboard year-end top 50 country & western singles of 1958

References

Jim Reeves songs
1958 songs